David McFarlane (born 10 April 1979) is a Scottish footballer.

McFarlane played for Hamilton Academical, Stenhousemuir, Albion Rovers and Dumbarton.

References

External links

Club profile

Scottish footballers
Hamilton Academical F.C. players
Stenhousemuir F.C. players
Albion Rovers F.C. players
Dumbarton F.C. players
1979 births
Living people
Scottish Football League players
Scotland under-21 international footballers
Footballers from Glasgow
Association football forwards